Papun-e Sofla (also Romanized as Pāpūn-e Soflá) is a village in Kuhmareh Rural District, Kuhmareh District, Kazerun County, Fars Province, Iran. At the 2006 census, its population was 564, in 116 families.

References 

Populated places in Kazerun County